Dribbling Darts (originally Dribbling Darts of Love) were a New Zealand band based in Auckland which existed from 1989 to 1993. The name is a quote from William Shakespeare, Measure for Measure, Act I, Scene III: "Believe not that the dribbling dart of love..." (may be a reference to Cupid).

The band were formed by Matthew Bannister when his move from Dunedin to Auckland led to the demise of his former band, the "Dunedin sound" group Sneaky Feelings. Other members of the Dribbling Darts of Love included Alice Bulmer, Ross Burge and Alan Gregg. They had a New Zealand Top 40 song with the offbeat "Hey Judith".

Richard Foulkes Jr. played drums on Florid Dabblers Voting (the title of which was an anagram of the band's name).

Discography

Singles

References

 Bannister, Matthew, Positively George Street, Reed, 1999.

External links

Flying Nun Records New Zealand – Dribbling Darts

Dribbling Darts of Love